The federal government of the United Arab Emirates (UAE federal government or UAE government) is the national government of the United Arab Emirates, a unitary federation  of seven self-governing emirates. The federal government is divided into a legislative, executive, and judicial branch. The executive branch namely, the Cabinet of the United Arab Emirates led by the Prime Minister of the United Arab Emirates, and the judicial branch, both report to the President of the United Arab Emirates. The Federal Supreme Council is the highest legislative body of the UAE and is responsible for appointing the President.

Article 120 of the UAE Constitution grants the federal government its mandate, and outlines its jurisdictions and balance of power with local governments.

History 

The UAE Federal Government was formed on December 2, 1971, when the rulers of five emirates, formerly part of the Trucial States established the United Arab Emirates. The UAE Constitution established the federal government and outlined its mandates and jurisdictions in Article 120 and Article 121. As part of the balance of powers between the Emirates, federal ministries were allocated based on representation, with Dubai maintaining Defence, Finance and Economy and Abu Dhabi retaining six cabinet posts, including Ministries of Interior and Foreign Affairs. Although not mentioned in the UAE Constitution, by convention, since its unification, the Ruler of Abu Dhabi has always assumed the position of President of the United Arab Emirates and the Ruler of Dubai assumes the position of Prime Minister of the UAE.

Legislative branch 

The Constitution of the United Arab Emirates defines the Federal Supreme Council as the main legislative arm of the Federal Government alongside the consultative Federal National Council.

Federal Supreme Council 

The Federal Supreme Council is one of the five federal bodies described in the UAE Constitution, and the highest constitutional authority of the federal government. The Council appoints the President of the United Arab Emirates, confirms the appointment of the Prime Minister, and approves or rejects federal laws. Membership of the Council consists of the Rulers of each of the emirates, with the Emirate of Abu Dhabi and the Emirate of Dubai holding exclusive veto rights.

Federal National Council 

The Federal National Council is one of the five federal bodies of the UAE, and is the consultative parliamentary organ of the federal government. The 40-member council consists of 20 members appointed by the Rulers of each emirate, and the other 20 are voted by a selected electoral college. The FNC has authority to question Federal Ministers, review the federal budget, and provide suggestions to government bodies.

Executive branch 

The executive branch of the federal government consists of the President of the UAE and the Cabinet of the UAE.

President 

The President of the UAE has wide-ranging powers and authority to issue decrees for federal laws, consult with the Prime Minister on the appointment of federal Ministers or heads of federal authorities and acts as Supreme Commander of the United Arab Emirates Armed Forces. The President nominates the Prime Minister of the UAE and judges for the Federal Supreme Court of the United Arab Emirates and as head of the Federal Supreme Council, the President can call meetings and set policy agendas in addition to exclusive authority over foreign affairs.

Prime Minister and Cabinet of the UAE 

The Prime Minister is the head of government and leads the Cabinet of the UAE, which consists of the major ministries of the Emirate. The Cabinet interprets federal law and issues resolutions to federal ministries and agencies on how to enforce the laws. The Federal Government has 52 federal ministries and federal authorities under its supervision with varying jurisdiction based on local agreements, or federal authorities that have national jurisdiction such as Emirates Post, and the Telecommunications Regulatory Authority (UAE).

Local governments 

The Constitution of the United Arab Emirates allows each emirate major autonomy on various domestic aspects, and the right to request the Federal Government to manage other domestic aspects. Each Emirate interprets federal law independently and has the right to issue its own guidelines and laws, and thus laws and procedures can differ greatly between various local governments. Each local government has its own Ruler, and Executive Council which manages the day-to-day affairs of the local government.

Jurisdiction and scope of local governments vary with local authorities like the Government of Dubai with independent energy, education, judicial, and religious affairs similar to the Abu Dhabi Government, and other local authorities like the Government of Ajman maintaining only municipal and economic policy affairs, with other aspects such as energy and water management, religious affairs, and health the responsibility of the federal government.

References 

Politics of the United Arab Emirates